The women's heptathlon event at the 1995 Summer Universiade was held on 30–31 August at the Hakatanomori Athletic Stadium in Fukuoka, Japan.

Medalists

Results

100 metres hurdles
Wind:Heat 1: +0.8 m/s, Heat 2: +1.1 m/s, Heat 3: +0.3 m/s

High jump

Shot put

200 metres
Wind:Heat 1: +0.4 m/s, Heat 2: 0.0 m/s, Heat 3: -0.9 m/s

Long jump

Javelin throw

800 metres

Final standings

References

Athletics at the 1995 Summer Universiade
1995 in women's athletics
1995